Red Lake is a census-designated place (CDP) within the Lower Red Lake unorganized territory located in Beltrami County, Minnesota, United States.  As of the 2020 census, Red Lake had a total population of 1,786.  The Red Lake Indian Reservation is based in Red Lake.

History

2005 shooting

On March 21, 2005, the community was the site of a shooting spree. A high school student murdered his grandfather and girlfriend at his home, before killing five students, two adults, and then himself at the local high school.

Geography
According to the United States Census Bureau, the CDP has a total area of 5.1 mi (13.1 km), of which 4.8 mi (12.5 km) is land and 0.2 mi (0.6 km), 4.70%, is water.

Demographics

At the 2000 census there were 1,430 people, 400 households, and 320 families in the CDP.  The population density was 110.2/mi (42.5/km).  There were 421 housing units at an average density of 32.4² (12.5/km).  The racial makeup of the CDP was 97.69% Native American, 1.82% White, 0.28% Black or African American, 0.07% from other races, and 0.14% from two or more races.  Hispanic or Latino of any race were 1.47%.

Of the 400 households 49.0% had children under the age of 18 living with them, 24.5% were married couples living together, 42.0% had a female householder with no husband present, and 20.0% were non-families. 18.3% of households were one person and 4.3% were one person aged 65 or older.  The average household size was 3.53 and the average family size was 3.88.

The age distribution was 44.1% under the age of 18, 12.0% from 18 to 24, 24.1% from 25 to 44, 15.6% from 45 to 64, and 4.3% 65 or older.  The median age was 21 years.  For every 100 females, there were 94.0 males.  For every 100 females age 18 and over, there were 84.3 males.

The median household income was $23,224, and the median family income was $20,800. Males had a median income of $22,257 versus $22,431 for females. The per capita income for the CDP was $8,787.  About 36.8% of families and 36.4% of the population were below the poverty line, including 42.8% of those under the age of 18 and 44.4% of those 65 and older.

Education
It is in the Red Lake School District, which operates Red Lake Elementary Complex and Red Lake Secondary Complex (formerly Red Lake High School).

Media

Television

References

External links

 Red Lake Nation
 Red Lake News

Census-designated places in Beltrami County, Minnesota
Census-designated places in Minnesota
Ojibwe in Minnesota
Anishinaabe communities in the United States